Kalamazoo Central High School is a public high school in Kalamazoo, Michigan serving students from ninth through twelfth grades. It was the first public high school in Michigan. It began operating in 1858 and graduated its first class of five men and three women in 1859. It moved to its current location in 1972. It is rated Class A by the Michigan High School Athletic Association (MHSAA). On May 4, 2010, the White House announced that Central High had won the first annual Race to the Top High School Commencement Challenge and that President Barack Obama would deliver the school’s 2010 commencement address.

Kalamazoo Central students are eligible for the Kalamazoo Promise, which provides reduced or free college tuition for students attending public colleges in Michigan.

History

The first legal public high-school in Kalamazoo and in the state of Michigan began operating in 1858. The first class, consisting of five men and three women graduated in 1859. Charles E. Stuart sued the Kalamazoo School Board in 1874 alleging that the school-board's use of taxpayer money to fund secondary education was unconstitutional (up until that point taxpayers money was only for elementary schools).  The School Board prevailed, setting a precedent allowing publicly funded secondary education throughout the country. In 1925 the school moved to the building currently known as Old Central High School at 714 South Westnedge. On the fourth floor of the Old Central High School is currently located the Kalamazoo Area Mathematics and Science Center, or KAMSC.  Following the largest graduating class of 799 students in 1960, some Central High School students transferred to the newly opened Loy Norrix High School in 1961.  Central High School moved to its current location in 1972.

After the introduction of the Kalamazoo Promise scholarship program, the school along with the Kalamazoo Public Schools system was placed into the national spotlight highlighted with a Katie Couric visit.  Enrollment in KPS has risen significantly, and the surrounding area has begun to find economic benefits.

Buddy Holly and the Crickets played a show in the Old Central High School Auditorium on April 28, 1958.

Demographics
The demographic breakdown of the 1,595 students enrolled in 2013-14 was:
Male - 48.7%
Female - 51.3%
Native American/Alaskan - 0.6%
Asian/Pacific islanders - 2.4%
Black - 49.1%
Hispanic - 8.7%
White - 33.7%
Multiracial - 5.5%

64.6% of the students were eligible for free or reduced lunch.

Student activities
The Choir program competes in the MSVMA (Michigan State Vocal Music Association).

The Mock Trial team took first place at Nationals in 1996.

Athletics
Kalamazoo Central's Maroon Giants compete in the Southwestern Michigan Athletic Conference. The school colors are maroon and white. The following MHSAA sanctioned sports are offered:

Bowling (boys & girls)
Football (boys)
Baseball (boys)
Basketball (boys & girls) 
Boys state champion - 1932, 1938, 1949, 1950, 1951, 2010, 2011
Softball (girls)
Soccer (boys & girls)
Track (boys & girls)
Boys state champion - 1933, 1942, 1965
Tennis (boys & girls)
Boys state champion - 1937
Girls state champion - 1972
Wrestling (boys)
Swimming and Diving (boys & girls)
Lacrosse (boys & girls) **
Ice hockey (boys) **
Volleyball (girls)
State champion - 1996
Golf (boys & girls)
Boys state champion - 1939, 1940
Girls state champion - 1994, 1995, 1996
Cross-Country (boys & girls)
Boys state champion - 1925, 1926, 1927, 1928, 1930(tied), 1931, 1935, 1943, 1946, 1950,  1954
Skiing (boys & girls)
Competitive cheer (girls)

**Kalamazoo United teams with Loy Norrix High School

Notable alumni

Neil Berry, former MLB player (Detroit Tigers, St. Louis Browns, Chicago White Sox, Baltimore Orioles)
Don Boven, NBA basketball player
Jerome Harrison, former NFL running back (Cleveland Browns, Philadelphia Eagles, Detroit Lions)
Ron Jackson, former MLB player (Chicago White Sox, Boston Red Sox)
Greg Jennings, former NFL wide receiver (Green Bay Packers, Miami Dolphins, Minnesota Vikings) football player, Super Bowl champion
Derek Jeter (1992), Captain of the New York Yankees (2003–2014), five-time World Series champion and fourteen time All-Star, member High School Athletic Hall of Fame
Jordan Klepper, comedian
 Danny Lewis (born 1970), American-English basketball player
 Isaiah Livers, NBA player for the Detroit Pistons
James McDivitt (1947), NASA astronaut
Scott Rehberg (1992), former NFL player (New England Patriots, Cleveland Browns, and Cincinnati Bengals)
Mike Squires, Major League Baseball player
Frederick S. Strong, US Army major general
Kurt Thoroughman, professor of biomedical engineering at Washington University in St. Louis
Dorothy B. Waage, numismatist
Duane Young, San Diego Chargers football player

See also
Kalamazoo Public Schools

References

External links
 Kalamazoo Central High School official site

Public high schools in Michigan
Educational institutions established in 1858
Schools in Kalamazoo, Michigan
1858 establishments in Michigan